is a singer and actress. She has released 12 singles and 2 albums on the Avex Trax label in Japan. She has also performed with the musical units  and A Girls.

Discography

Studio albums

Singles

As featured artist

Photobooks
Pretty Private, published on November 11, 2004, by Kadokawa Shoten.

References

External links
  
 Avex Trax official profile 

1985 births
Living people
Actresses from Kanagawa Prefecture
Japanese-language singers
Japanese women pop singers
Japanese idols
Avex Group artists
Musicians from Kanagawa Prefecture
21st-century Japanese singers
21st-century Japanese women singers